O. commutata may refer to:

 Omphalodes commutata, a flowering plant
 Orbea commutata, a flowering plant
 Oxalis commutata, a herbaceous plant